Hasanabad District is a district (bakhsh) in Eqlid County, Fars Province, Iran. At the 2006 census, its population was 15,698, in 3,407 families.  The District has one city Hasanabad.  The District has three rural districts (dehestan): Ahmadabad Rural District, Bakan Rural District, and Hasanabad Rural District.

References 

Eqlid County
Districts of Fars Province